Moppin is a locality on the Mungindi railway line in north-western New South Wales, Australia. It was the site of a railway station between 1913 and 1975.

References 

Towns in New South Wales